Erechthias minuscula, the erechthias clothes moth, is a moth of the family Tineidae. It was first described by Lord Walsingham in 1897. It is widespread and has been recorded from Africa, Sri Lanka, Java, Australia, the Caroline Islands, Fiji, Samoa, the Marquesas, the West Indies, Hawaii and Florida.

Description
The length of the forewings is 3.5–4 mm. The ground color of the adults is mostly cream or pale straw colored. The forewings, which are strongly upturned at the tips, are variably and extensively marked with pale to dark brown scales.

Pest attack
The larvae are scavengers in dead plant materials and may be found in dead tree trunks, stems, leaves, fruits, and seed pods. Recorded plant material used as food includes Acacia koa, Acacia koaia, banana, Calotropis, Cassia, eggplant, fig, Lantana, palms, Pandanus, papaya, pineapple, Pipturus, Sapindus oahuensis, Sicana odorifera as well as old tamarind pods.

References

External links

Moths described in 1897
Erechthiinae
Fauna of Seychelles